The Asia Pacific Screen Awards (APSA) is an international cultural initiative overseen by the Asia Pacific Screen Academy and headquartered in Australia. In order to realise UNESCO's goals of promoting and preserving the different cultures through the influential medium of cinema, it honours and promotes the films, actors, directors, and cultures of the Asia Pacific area to a worldwide audience.

Event history
APSA was established in 2007 and works with FIAPF, the International Federation of Film Producers Associations. An international jury selects the winners, and films are evaluated based on their cinematic quality and how well they reflect their cultural backgrounds. More than 70 nations and regions in the Asia Pacific region are represented by APSA, which introduces their films to new international audiences. It is a sister organisation to the European Film Academy and Premios PLATINO del Cine Iberoamericano.

Nominees are inducted into the Asia Pacific Screen Academy. Australian screen legend, Jack Thompson AM, is the President of the Academy.

Members of the International Jury in the past include Tran Anh Hung, Annemarie Jacir, Anocha Suwichakornpong, Garin Nugroho, Diana El Jieroudi, Eric Khoo, Mike Downey, Rubaiyat Hossain, Alexander Rodnyansky, Nia Dinata, Deepak Rauniyar, Jill Bilcock, He Saifei, Adolfo Alix Jr, Asghar Farhadi, Anthony Chen, Hiam Abbass, Lu Yue, Maciej Stuhr, Rajit Kapur, Shyam Benegal, Malini Fonseka, Nansun Shi, David Puttnam, Sergey Dvortsevoy, Salman Aristo, Gina Kim, Samuel Maoz, Kaori Momoi, Tahmineh Milani, Jan Chapman, Sasson Gabai, Tian Zhuangzhuang, Aparna Sen, Bruce Beresford, Huang Jianxin, Shabana Azmi and Jafar Panahi.

Film categories and awards 
The following four film categories are available for submission of movies:
 Feature Film
 Animated Feature Film
 Youth Feature Film
 Documentary Feature Film

The following accomplishments are recognised with awards:
 Best Feature Film
 Best Animated Feature Film
 Best Documentary Feature Film
 Best Youth Feature Film
 Achievement in Directing
 Best Screenplay
 Achievement in Cinematography
 Best Performance by an Actress
 Best Performance by an Actor
 Jury Grand Prize

In addition, exceptional success is recognised with special awards:
 FIAPF Award for outstanding achievement in film in the Asia Pacific region.
 Cultural Diversity Award under the patronage of UNESCO for the outstanding contribution to the promotion and preservation of cultural diversity through film.
 Young Cinema Award in partnership with NETPAC and Griffith Film School, recognises the abundant emerging talent of the Asia Pacific.

Major award winners

Other awards
On November 29, 2018, the 12th Asia Pacific Screen Awards presented the Best Original Score Asia Pacific Screen Award for the first time.the head of the jury for the first-ever award was Ryuichi Sakamoto. This new category is intended to "honour more excellent films and the musicians who contribute so profoundly to the emotions of the movie," according to APSA Chairman Michael Hawkins..

Winners and nominees 
2018

References

External links
Official website

 
Awards established in 2007
Australian film awards
Recurring events established in 2007
Australian television awards